Vasant Shankar Davkhare was an Indian politician of the Nationalist Congress Party. He had been the Deputy Chairman of the Maharashtra Legislative Council since 1998.

On 22 May 2010 Davkhare's wife died due to massive cardiac arrest. Davkhare died on 4 January 2018 from kidney failure. Vasant Davkhare was known for maintaining good relations with all political parties and leaders in Maharashtra. He had good hold on Thane politics in his full career. Shiv Sena Thane's giant leader Anand Dighe and Vasant Davkhare's friendship is idol for all politicians until date from two different parties. Vasant Davkhare was unopposed elected thrice by direct support by Shiv sena Chief late shri. Balasaheb Thackeray. Former Chief Minister Vilasrao Deshmukh, Bahujan Vikas Aghadi Chief Hitendra Thakur (Appa) were known to be best friends of late. Shri Vasant Davkhare.

References

Nationalist Congress Party politicians from Maharashtra
People from Thane
Marathi politicians
Members of the Maharashtra Legislative Council
Living people
1949 births
Chairs of the Maharashtra Legislative Council